The 1840 Missouri gubernatorial election was held on August 3, 1840.

Election Results
In the election, Democrat Thomas Reynolds defeated Whig candidate John Bullock Clark.  Thomas Reynolds would not live for the full length of this term, committing suicide on February 9, 1844, and being replaced by Lt. Governor Meredith Miles Marmaduke.

References

Missouri
1840
Gubernatorial
August 1840 events